Sardar Zulfiqar Ali Khan Dullah  is a Pakistani politician who had been a member of the National Assembly of Pakistan from August 2018 till January 2023. Previously he was a Member of the Provincial Assembly of the Punjab, from May 2013 to May 2018.

Early life and education
He was born on 19 May 1954 in Chakwal.

He graduated in law from the University of Karachi in 1997 and has degrees of Bachelor of Arts and Bachelor of Laws.

Political career

He was elected to the Provincial Assembly of the Punjab as a candidate of Pakistan Muslim League (N) (PML-N) from Constituency PP-22 (Chakwal-III) in 2013 Pakistani general election.

In June 2018, he was nominated by the PML-N as its candidate from Constituency PP-23 (Chakwal-III) for 2018 general election. However he quit PML-N and joined Pakistan Tehreek-e-Insaaf (PTI).

He was elected to the National Assembly of Pakistan as a candidate of PTI from Constituency NA-64 (Chakwal-I) in 2018 general election. He received 155,214 votes and defeated Tahir Iqbal.

Controversy
In September 2018, a deputy commissioner from Chakwal wrote a letter to the Election Commission of Pakistan and the Supreme Court of Pakistan in which he accused Dullah of illegally interfering in transfers and postings of 17 members of the revenue field staff. The deputy commissioner also accused Dullah of threatening him "with dire consequences in case of non-compliance".

References

External Link

More Reading
 List of members of the 15th National Assembly of Pakistan

Living people
1954 births
Punjab MPAs 2013–2018
Pakistani MNAs 2018–2023
Pakistan Muslim League (N) MPAs (Punjab)
Pakistan Tehreek-e-Insaf MNAs